Observationes Medicae  is a 1641 book by Nicolaes Tulp. Tulp is primarily famous today for his central role in the 1632 group portrait by Rembrandt of the Amsterdam Guild of Surgeons, which commemorates his appointment as praelector in 1628.

"Observationes Medicae" is also the title commonly used by early Dutch doctors in the 16th and 17th centuries who wrote up their cases from private practise in Latin to share with contemporary colleagues.

Professor Tulp
Though already well known at the time his book was written, Professor Tulp enjoyed international fame after publishing this book, and in 1652 a second edition was printed, highly unusual at that time. His book comprises 164 cases from his practise, kept in a diary from his early career onwards. His book was illustrated with plates, and it is not clear who drew these or engraved them. According to various sources, he drew many of these himself. His birth name was Claes Pietersz. He adopted the name Tulp when he had a Tulip shaped sign placed outside his door when he set up shop in Amsterdam. Many of his early patients could not read or write. He soon no longer needed to advertise his services, however, and his many duties as Praelector, and later, mayor of the city of Amsterdam, prevented him from spending so much time on his practise. He published the book 5 years after the Amsterdam Pharmacopoeia was completed, which was his own personal initiative, and that helped to set intercity medical standards in the region known as the United Provinces.

Vondel
Tulp had a reputation for a moral upstanding character, and Joost van den Vondel wrote poetry extolling his virtue. He later also wrote a poem in honor of the second edition of this book.

Earliest illustration of a chimpanzee
Tulp's book has various accounts of unusual illnesses and primarily growths or carcinomas, but also has accounts of creatures brought back from Dutch East India Company ships. His drawing of a chimpanzee is considered the first of its kind. This creature was called an Indian Satyr, since all ships cargo was considered Indonesian. However, the accompanying text claims the animal came from Angola. This drawing was copied many times and formed the basis for many theories on the origin of man. Most notably, Tulp's work and that of Jacob de Bondt (alias Jacobus Bontius) was copied and republished by Linnaeus to show a link between apes and man.

Jan de Doot

One of the interesting cases is the story of how Jan de Doot performed a bladder operation on himself.

But this stone weighing 4 ounces and the size of a hen's egg was a wonder how it came out with the help of one hand, without the proper tools, and then from the patient himself, whose greatest help was courage and impatience embedded in a truly impenetrable faith which caused a brave deed as none other. So was he no less than those whose deeds are related in the old scriptures. Sometimes daring helps when reason doesn't.

Ludovicus Wolzogen

Observationes Medicae became so popular, that a hundred years later a translated version was published. Professor Tulp never wanted to publish in Dutch for fear of hypochondriac behavior. He was very against quacks and self-medication and it was for this reason that he worked on the Amsterdam Pharmacopoeia. This second version therefore, would have been against his wishes. However, the book was prefaced by a long lykoratie, or ode to his memory, in which Ludovicus Wolzogen explains what a wonderful man Tulp was, and everything that he did for the city of Amsterdam and medicine in general. He claims to have made an accurate translation from the Latin, but the flowery language is so different from Tulp's terse descriptions, that this is highly unlikely. After this edition, the number of cases went up from 164 to 251,

Index Capitvm Libri I
The chapters and accompanying plates of the 1641 and 1740 editions of Book one are the same, only four extra chapters appear in the later version.

	1	Calvaria fracta.
	2	Occulta capitis rima
	3	Fractura ossis cuneiformis
	4	Fractura capitis sanata
	5	Salutaris modioli usus.
	6	Morbus attonitus
	7	Morbus attonitus a sanguine
	8	Morbus comitialis sponte sanatus
	9	Morbus comitialis a splene
	10	Morbus comitialis a vulva
	11	Epilepsia fexies cottidie accedens
	12	Tremor periodicus
	13	Reciprocus capitis dolor
	14	Convulvsio sedentaria
	15	Praesagium convulsionis periodicae
	16	Viti saltus
	17	Malleatio
	18	Imaginaria ossium mollities
	19	Mola imaginaria
	20	Aquaemetus
	21	Senexrabiosus
	22	Catalepsis ex amore
	23	Pollicis tremor, a detractione sanguinis
	24	Hydrocephalus
	25	Hydrocephalus dimidiati capitis
	26	Polypus narium
	27	Polypus cordis
	28	Oculiprocidentia

	29	Encanthiscancrosa
	30	Vulnus pupillae sanatum
	31	Caecitas a veneno
	32	Dolor capitis a natura devictus
	33	Dolor inter caput, ac pedem reciprocus
	34	Pedes talpini
	35	Respiratio per aures
	36	Mors a dente genuino
	37	Ulera palati
	38	Prolapsus palati
	39	Vox a febre intercepta
	40	Idem silentium a pituita
	41	Mutus loquens
	42	Gula resoluta
	43	Inedia undecim dierum
	44	Lethalis gula tumor
	45	Idem tumor a pituita
	46	Strumarum anatome
	47	Cancer quinquaginta annos innoxius
	48	Arteriotomia
	49	Sanguis ex dente
	50	Vulnus aspera arteriae
	51	Angina interna
	52	Ranula
	53	Cancer mammarum
	54	Evanidae mammarum pustulae
	55	Livor ex tusst

Index Capitvm Lib. II
The chapters and accompanying plates of the 1641 and 1740 editions of Book two are the same, only one extra chapter appears in the later version.

	1	Dolor pleuriticus e bile
	2	Sanguis octies puerperaemissus
	3	Pleuritis sanguinem venis subtrahens
	4	Pleuritis suppurata
	5	Legitima thoracis sectio
	6	Pus thoracis per umbilicum
	7	Rara difficilis spiritus caussa
	8	Marcor ostreis sanatus
	9	Idem successus a sola natura
	10	Vomica pulmonis
	11	Sputum sanguinis triginta annorum
	12	Surculus, venae arteriosae, expectoratus
	13	Integra vena a pulmone rejecta
	14	Frustum pulmonis, fauces occludens
	15	Turunda ore rejecta
	16	Hydrops thoracis
	17	Pulmp praecisus
	18	Vulnus cordis
	19	Cordis palpitatio a Liene
	20	Ira puerperis noxia
	21	Vomitus bilis atrae
	22	Vomitus octodecim mensium
	23	Vomitus pituitae concretae
	24	Praegnans edensmille quadringentos haleces
	25	Calculus arterialis
	26	Fibrae jocinoris vulneratae
	27	Pus Iocinoris, peros, ac alvum

	28	Lien verberans
	29	Lien disruptus
	30	Magnus lien
	31	Sanguis cutem transudans
	32	Steatoma mesenterii
	33	Steatoma cum ulcere, & aqua
	34	Hydrops cum vesiculis mesenterii
	35	Tympanites cum ascite
	36	Morbus regius, cum hydrope
	37	Abscessus mesenterii, a partu disruptus
	38	Ventrissectio
	39	Perforatio scroti
	40	Mors ex depresso ventre
	41	Volvulus ex ira
	42	Caput lumbrici lati
	43	Ischuria lunatica
	44	Calculus renum
	45	Calculus ureterem obturans
	46	Diabetes
	47	Mictus lapidosus
	48	Membrana lapidescens
	49	Mictus vermis cruenti
	50	Unde viginti vermiculi emicti
	51	Cottidianus vermium mictus
	52	Periodicus capillorum mictus
	53	Ulcus vesicae sanatum

Index Capitvm Lib. III 
The chapters and accompanying plates of the 1641 and 1740 editions of Book three are the same, the Indisch Satyr is also the last plate in the later version.

	1	Misera, virginis gibbosa, conditio
	2	Vesica a calculo consumpta
	3	Gangraena umbilici
	4	Lapides bezoarticiin homine
	5	Calculus vesica adnatus
	6	Calculus vesica arcte circumdatus
	7	Calculus trium unciarum sponte excretus
	8	Modus eximendi calculum ex urethra
	9	Turunda lapidescens
	10	Lethalis ani tumor
	11	Dolor ani quarta hora a solut an alyo
	12	Lumbricus ex inguine
	13	Periculosa hernia sanata
	14	Sapientia juvenilis
	15	Praeposterum silentium
	16	Immoderatus clysteris usus
	17	Interior intestini tunica excreta
	18	Adepscottidie ab alvo prodiens
	19	Idem adeps, ab alvo, ac vesica
	20	Vulnus, latioris intestini sanatum
	21	Valvula intestinalis
	22	Convulsio abdominis
	23	Abscessus inguinum, a vulva
	24	Tabes dorsalis
	25	Coxa dolor adscessu fanatus
	26	Coxa ferramento exusta
	27	Vulnus spinalis medullae
	28	Fistula insanabilis

	29	Lethalis lumborem tumor
	30	Spina dorsibifida
	31	Vulva bili innatans
	32	Hydrops uteri
	33	Fungus ex vulva excifus
	34	Major fungus ibidem excifus
	35	Terus sive fricatrix
	36	Menstrua puellae quadrimae
	37	Partus monstri bicipitis
	38	Dissectio monstribicipitis
	39	Coles incurvatus
	40	Pediculi pubis
	41	Mors ex flore calcis
	42	Sudor septem annorum
	43	Excoriatio ab oleo Vitrioli
	44	Exedenspraecordiorum herpes
	45	Pulfus arteriae extracarpum, explorandus
	46	Gangraena universalis
	47	Gangraena pedis
	48	Sphacelus brachii, a febre
	49	Atrophia brachii suctu sanata
	50	Rotundum vulnus
	51	Carcinoma fremoris
	52	Febris quintana
	53	Cibi abstinentia quartanae lethalis
	54	Error naturae compensatus
	55	Incredibile corporis humani incrementum
	56	Indisch Satyr

Index Capitvm Lib. IV 
There is no Book four in the original version, but the later version calls it Register der Hoofdstukken van het vierde boek. The sixty chapters and accompanying plates are some of the most popular in Dutch medical literature, however, including the Jan de Doot (or Jan Lethaus, a bastardized version of the Latin for lethal - lethalis), ending with a chapter on Tea.

References

External links
 Observationes Medicae—Full Latin text in Google books of Amstelredamensis Observationes Medicae, Nicolai Tulpii, Amsterdam Elzevier, 1652 edition, digitalized from a copy in the possession of the Bavarian State Library
 Geneeskundige Waarnemingen—Copies in Google books on the Dutch translation Geneeskundige Waarnemingen van Nicolaas Tulp
 Drie boecken der medicijnsche aenmerkingen, copy from 1650 in Google books
 Illustrations from Medical Observations by N. Tulpius on UNESCO site
 Explanation of Rembrandt's painting in the Mauritshuis museum 

1641 books
History of anatomy
History of medicine
1640s in science
1641 in science